Massilia eurypsychrophila is a Gram-negative, aerobic, rod-shaped and facultatively psychrophilic bacterium from the genus Massilia with a polar flagella which has been isolated from the ice core of the Muztagh Glacier in Xinjiang in China.

References

External links
Type strain of Massilia eurypsychrophila at BacDive -  the Bacterial Diversity Metadatabase

Burkholderiales
Bacteria described in 2015
Psychrophiles